Gilberto Sosa (born 23 September 1960 in Mexico City) is a Mexican former boxer who competed in the men's light flyweight division. He represented his native country at the 1979 Pan American Games, where he captured the bronze medal; at the 1979 Latin American Boxing Championship, where he also won the bronze medal, and at the 1980 Summer Olympics in Moscow.

1980 Olympic results
Below is the record of Gilberto Sosa, a Mexican light flyweight boxer who competed at the 1980 Moscow Olympics:

 Round of 32: defeated Vanduin Bayasgalan (Mongolia) by decision, 4-1
 Round of 16: lost to Li Byong-uk (North Korea) by decision, 2-3

References

1960 births
Living people
Boxers from Mexico City
Flyweight boxers
Boxers at the 1980 Summer Olympics
Olympic boxers of Mexico
Mexican male boxers
Boxers at the 1979 Pan American Games
Pan American Games bronze medalists for Mexico
Pan American Games medalists in boxing
Medalists at the 1979 Pan American Games